Purcell's Odes to St Cecilia may refer to:
 Hail! Bright Cecilia (1692)
 Welcome to all the pleasures (1683)